Childbirth-related post-traumatic stress disorder is a psychological disorder that can develop in women who have recently given birth. This disorder can also affect men or partners who have observed a difficult birth. Its symptoms are not distinct from post-traumatic stress disorder (PTSD).

Signs and symptoms
Examples of symptoms of childbirth-related post-traumatic stress disorder include intrusive symptoms such as flashbacks and nightmares, as well as symptoms of avoidance (including amnesia for the whole or parts of the event), problems in developing a mother-child attachment, not having sexual intercourse in order to prevent another pregnancy, and avoidance of birth- and pregnancy-related issues.  Symptoms of increasing stress can be sweating, trembling, being irritated, and sleep disturbances.

Other examples of symptoms of paternal childbirth-related post-traumatic stress disorder include anxiety or intense fear of losing their birthgiving partner or the child. This can lead to difficulties in the father-child connection.

Cause
Birth can be traumatic in different ways. Medical problems can result in interventions that can be frightening. The near death of a mother or baby, heavy bleeding, and emergency operations are examples of situations that can cause psychological trauma. Premature birth may be traumatic.
Emotional difficulties in coping with the pain of childbirth can also cause psychological trauma. Lack of support, or insufficient coping strategies to deal with the pain are examples of situations that can cause psychological trauma. However, even normal birth can be traumatic, and thus PTSD is diagnosed based on symptoms of the mother and not whether or not there were complications.
Additionally, in the process of birth, medical professionals who are there to aid the birthing mother may need to examine and perform procedures in the genital regions.

The following are correlated with PTSD: 
 Medical complications before, during, or after childbirth:
Pregnancy complications
 Emergency C-section
 Instrumental delivery
 Episiotomy
 Severe pain during birth
 Postpartum complications
 Preterm labour
 History of infertility
 Inadequate care during labour
 Social, psychological, and other factors:
 Unwanted pregnancy
 Low socioeconomic status
 Primiparous (first labour)
 Parenting (infant caring) problems
 Social support following childbirth
 Cultural factors
 History of mental health issues
 Other life stressors

Diagnosis
Childbirth-related PTSD is not a recognized diagnosis in the Diagnostic and Statistical Manual of Mental Disorders.  Many women presenting with symptoms of PTSD after childbirth are misdiagnosed with postpartum depression or adjustment disorders.  These diagnoses can lead to inadequate treatment.

Epidemiology
Prevalence of PTSD following normal childbirth (excluding stillbirth or major complications) is estimated to be between 2.8% and 5.6% at six weeks postpartum, with rates dropping to 1.5% at six months postpartum. Symptoms of PTSD are common following childbirth, with prevalence of 24–30.1% at six weeks, dropping to 13.6% at six months.

See also 
Miscarriage
Pain management during childbirth
Miscarriage and mental illness

References

Further reading 

 
 
 
 
 

Post-traumatic stress disorder
Maternal disorders predominantly related to pregnancy
Mental disorders associated with pregnancy, childbirth or the puerperium